Jørn Karlsrud (born 10 October 1965) is a retired Norwegian football midfielder.

He started his career in Askim IF, and joined Moss FK ahead of the 1988 season. He signed for Kongsvinger IL ahead of the 1992 season, was ever-present in 1992 and only missed one Norwegian Premier League game between 1992 and 1997. In 1998, he only played two games, but then returned as a regular until leaving in 2001.

He joined Galterud IF as playing assistant coach. After the 2003 season he rejoined Kongsvinger IL as an assistant coach. He also played briefly for Kongsvinger IL's B team. In 2008, he played for Galterud.

References

1965 births
Living people
Norwegian footballers
Moss FK players
Kongsvinger IL Toppfotball players
People from Askim
Eliteserien players
Association football midfielders
Sportspeople from Viken (county)